Cyrus Adler (September 13, 1863 – April 7, 1940) was an American educator, Jewish religious leader and scholar.

Early years
Adler was born to merchant and planter Samuel Adler and Sarah Sulzberger in Van Buren, Arkansas on September 13, 1863, but in the next year his parents removed to Philadelphia, Pennsylvania, and soon he attended the public schools there, and in 1879 he entered the University of Pennsylvania, where graduated in 1883. He afterwards pursued Oriental studies in Johns Hopkins University, was appointed university scholar there in 1884, and was fellow in Semitic languages from 1885 to 1887, when he gained the first American PhD in Semitics from the University, where appointed instructor in Semitic languages and promoted to be associate professor in 1890. He taught Semitic languages at Johns Hopkins from 1884 to 1893.

Career
In 1877 he was appointed assistant curator of the section of Oriental antiquities in the United States National Museum, and had charge of an exhibit of biblical archaeology at the centennial exposition of the Ohio valley in 1888. He was a commissioner for the world's Columbian exposition to the Orient in 1890, and he passed sixteen months in Turkey, Syria, Egypt, Tunis, Algiers, and Morocco securing exhibits. For a number of years he was employed by the Smithsonian Institution at Washington, with a focus on archaeology and Semitics, serving as the Librarian from December 1, 1892 to 1905. In 1895, after years of searching, he located the Jefferson Bible and purchased it for the Smithsonian Institution from the great-granddaughter of Thomas Jefferson.

He was made lecturer on biblical archaeology in the Jewish Theological Seminary in New York, president of the American Jewish Historical Society, U.S. delegate to a conference on an international catalogue of scientific literature in 1898, and honorary assistant curator of historic archaeology and custodian of historic religions in the U.S. national museum.

In 1900, he was elected as a member of the American Philosophical Society.

Last years
He was a founder of the Jewish Welfare Board.
He was president of Dropsie College for Hebrew and Cognate Learning from 1908 to 1940 and Chancellor of the Jewish Theological Seminary of America. In addition, he was a founding member of the Oriental Club of Philadelphia. He was involved in the creation of various Jewish organizations including the Jewish Publication Society, the American Jewish Historical Society, the American Jewish Committee (also its president in 1929–1940), and the United Synagogue of America. Adler served a variety of organizations by holding various offices. For example, he was on the board of trustees at the American Jewish Publication Society and Gratz College, served as vice-president of the Anthropological Society of Washington, and as member of council of the Philosophical Society of Washington.

Adler was a bachelor much of his life, marrying Racie Friedenwald of Baltimore in 1905, when he was 42. They had one child, a daughter Sarah.
From 1911 until 1916, Adler was Parnas (president) of Congregation Mikveh Israel of Philadelphia.
He died in Philadelphia, and his papers are held by the Center for Advanced Judaic Studies at the University of Pennsylvania.

Works
Adler was an editor of the Jewish Encyclopedia and in collaboration with Allen Ramsay wrote Tales Told in a Coffee House (1898). He was part of the committee that translated the Jewish Publication Society version of the Hebrew Bible published in 1917. At the end of World War I, he participated in the Paris Peace Conference in 1919.

He was also a contributor to the New International Encyclopedia. His many scholarly writings include articles on comparative religion, Assyriology, and Semitic philology. He edited the American Jewish Year Book from 1899 to 1905 and the Jewish Quarterly Review from 1910 to 1940. He was besides contributions to the Journal of the American Oriental Society, the Proceedings of the American Philological Association, the Andover Review, Hebraica, Johns Hopkins University Circular and numerous reviews.

References

Citations

Sources 

 
 Schwartz, Shuly Rubin. The Emergence of Jewish Scholarship in America: The Publication of the Jewish Encyclopedia. Monographs of the Hebrew Union College, Number 13. Cincinnati: Hebrew Union College Press, 1991.

Further reading
Adler, Cyrus. I Have Considered the Days. Philadelphia: The Jewish Publication Society of America, 1941.
Neuman, Abraham A. Cyrus Adler: A Biographical Sketch. New York: The American Jewish Committee, 1942.

External links 

Cyrus Adler Lectures on His Presidentially-Mandated Tour of The Levant Shapell Manuscript Foundation
 Articles written by Cyrus Adler on the Berman Jewish Policy Archive @ NYU Wagner
 The Jewish Theological Seminary, New York archival entry on Adler's papers.
 Guide to the papers of Cyrus Adler at the American Jewish Historical Society, New York, New York.
 Fact Monster Entry for Cyrus Adler.
 
 
 

1863 births
1940 deaths
People from Van Buren, Arkansas
19th-century American people
University of Pennsylvania alumni
University of Pennsylvania faculty
Johns Hopkins University alumni
Johns Hopkins University faculty
Dropsie College faculty
Gratz College
Smithsonian Institution people
Judaic scholars
Jewish American historians
American male non-fiction writers
American religious leaders
Translators of the Bible into English
American librarians
American encyclopedists
American philologists
American Hebraists
American book editors
19th-century American historians
Jewish translators of the Bible
19th-century American male writers
19th-century translators
American Jewish Committee